"Be Lucky" is a song by English rock band the Who, written by Pete Townshend and recorded for the band's compilation album The Who Hits 50! released in 2014 and was proposed for a following album. The song was the first new material released by the Who in the eight years since their 2006 studio album Endless Wire. The royalties from "Be Lucky" benefited Teen Cancer America, a US outgrowth of Roger Daltrey's successful UK charity, the Teenage Cancer Trust.

Personnel
The Who
 Roger Daltrey – lead vocals; backing vocals
 Pete Townshend – guitars; backing vocals

Additional musicians
 Billy Nicholls – backing vocals
 Pino Palladino – bass guitar
 Zak Starkey – drums
 Mick Talbot – keyboards
 Simon Townshend – backing vocals

Production
 Richard Evans – cover design

References

The Who songs
2014 singles
2014 songs
Song recordings produced by Dave Eringa
Songs written by Pete Townshend
Charity singles